Rencontre avec le dragon (also known as "The Red Knight") is a French film directed by Hélène Angel.

Plot 
Guillaume travels with his friend Raoul de Vautadour who has a sinister secret: Every night he turns into a beast.
The little boy Felix, a great admirer, manages to come along with the both of them. In the beginning he is very happy about that. Yet eventually he realises the difference between legend and reality. Guillaume's poverty is not romantic but simply the sparse life of an outsider who has no alternative. His doings are not on a stringent crusade but a desperate search for purpose. Finally Felix understands that Guillaume is not to be envied.

Cast 
 Daniel Auteuil as Guillaume de Montauban
 Nicolas Nollet as Félix de Sisteron
 Sergi Lópezas Raoul de Ventadour
 Emmanuelle Devos as Gisela von Bingen
 Titoff as Hugues de Pertuys
 Gilbert Melki as Micholas Mespoulède
 Maurice Garrel as the Duke of Belzince
 Claude Perron as Isabelle de Ventadour
 Frédéric Proustas Baron Léon de Courtenay
 Bernard Blancan as Guillaume's sergeant

References

External links 
 
 

2003 films
2000s fantasy adventure films
Arthurian films
French fantasy adventure films
Films set in the Middle Ages
Sword and sorcery films
2000s French films